Bouna Department is a department of Bounkani Region in Zanzan District, Ivory Coast. In 2021, its population was 178,081 and its seat is the settlement of Bouna. The sub-prefectures of the department are Bouko, Bouna, Ondéfidouo, and Youndouo.

History

Bouna Department was created in 1974 as a split-off from Bondoukou Department. Using current boundaries as a reference, from 1974 to 2005 the department occupied the territory of Bounkani Region.

In 1997, regions were introduced as new first-level subdivisions of Ivory Coast; as a result, all departments were converted into second-level subdivisions. Bouna Department was included in Zanzan Region.

In 2005, Bouna Department was divided in order to create Nassian Department.

In 2011, districts were introduced as new first-level subdivisions of Ivory Coast. At the same time, regions were reorganised and became second-level subdivisions and all departments were converted into third-level subdivisions. At this time, Bouna Department became part of Bounkani Region in Zanzan District. At the same time, Bouna Department was divided into four parts to create Doropo and Téhini Departments. The fourth portion consists of a large section of Comoé National Park that was removed from any department.

Notes

Departments of Bounkani
1974 establishments in Ivory Coast
States and territories established in 1974